Stuart "Slim" Jones (May 6, 1913 – November 19, 1938) was an American professional baseball pitcher from Baltimore, Maryland. He played for the Baltimore Black Sox and the Philadelphia Stars of the East-West League and Negro National League from 1932 to 1938.

In 1934, Jones led the Negro National League in ERA (1.24), wins (20), and strikeouts (164) to become the first pitcher in Negro league history to achieve the pitching Triple Crown. This achievement was matched just two more times in league history. He was the winning pitcher in the final game of the Championship Series that clinched a pennant for the Stars.

Jones was plagued by trouble with alcoholism. He won just seven games in the four seasons he played after 1934. He died in Baltimore, Maryland, on November 19, 1938. According to legend, he froze to death after selling his coat for alcohol, but in reality he died after being admitted to a Baltimore hospital. 

Fourteen years after his death, Jones received votes listing him on the 1952 Pittsburgh Courier player-voted poll of the Negro leagues' best players ever.

References

Further reading

External links
 and Seamheads

1913 births
1938 deaths
Baltimore Black Sox players
Philadelphia Stars players
Baseball players from Baltimore
20th-century African-American sportspeople
Baseball pitchers
Deaths from hypothermia
Alcohol-related deaths in Maryland